承德 may refer to: 
 Chengde (承德市), prefecture-level city in Hebei Province, PR China
 Chengde County (承德县/承德縣), a county of Chengde City, Hebei Province, PR China
 Jōtoku, a Japanese era name